The Income Tax Act 1842 (citation 5 & 6 Vict c. 35) was an Act of the Parliament of the United Kingdom, passed under the government of Robert Peel, which re-introduced an income tax in Britain, at the rate of 7 pence (2.9%, there then being 240 pence in the pound) in the pound on all annual incomes greater than £150. It was the first imposition of income tax in Britain outside of wartime. Although promoted as a temporary measure, income tax has been levied continually in Britain ever since. In its detail, the Act of 1842 was substantially similar to the Income Tax Act 1803 introduced by Henry Addington during the Napoleonic Wars.

See also
UK tax
UK labour law

References

External links
John Paget, The Income Tax Act, 5 & 6 Vict. c. 35, with a practical and explanatory introduction and index, 1842, title page, act
The Creators of the Modern Income Tax

Tax legislation in the United Kingdom
United Kingdom Acts of Parliament 1842
Income tax in the United Kingdom